This is a list of notable converts to Christianity from Judaism.

The Jewish Encyclopedia gives some statistics on conversion of Jews to Protestantism, to Roman Catholicism, and to Orthodox Christianity (which it calls erroneously Greek Catholicism; Greek or Byzantine Catholics are under the See of Rome, not in the Orthodox Church). Some 2,000 European Jews converted to Christianity every year during the 19th century, but in the 1890s the number was running closer to 3,000 per year—1,000 in Austria Hungary (Galizian Poland), 1,000 in Russia (Poland, Belarus, Ukraine, and Lithuania), 500 in Germany (Posen), and the remainder in the English world.

The 19th century saw at least 250,000 Jews convert to Christianity according to existing records of various societies. Data from the Pew Research Center that as of 2013, about 1.6 million adult Americans of Jewish background identify themselves as Christians, most are Protestant. According to same data most of the Americans of Jewish background who identify themselves as some sort of Christian (1.6 million) were raised as Jews or are Jews by ancestry. According to 2012 study 17% of Jews in Russia identify themselves as Christians. According to Heman in Herzog-Hauck, "Real-Encyc." (x. 114), the number of converts during the 19th century exceeded 100,000. Salmon, in his Handbuch der Mission (1893, p. 48) claims 130,000; others claim as many as 250,000. For Russia alone 40,000 are claimed as having been converted from 1836 to 1875 while for England, up to 1875, the estimate is 50,000.

Modern conversions mainly occurred en masse and at critical periods. In England there was a large secession when individuals from the chief Sephardic families, the Bernals, Furtados, Ricardos, Disraelis, Ximenes, Lopez's, Uzziellis, and others, joined the Church (see Picciotto, "Sketches of Anglo-Jewish History"). Germany had three of these periods. The Mendelssohnian era was marked by numerous conversions. In 1811, David Friedlander handed Prussian State Chancellor Hardenberg a list of 32 Jewish families and 18 unmarried Jews who had recently abandoned their ancestral faith (Rabbi Abraham Geiger, "Vor Hundert Jahren," Brunswick, 1899). In the reign of Frederick William III., about 2,200 Jews were baptized (1822–1840), most of these being residents of the larger cities. The 3rd and longest period of secession was the anti-Semitic, beginning with the year 1880. During this time the other German states, besides Austria and France, had an equal share in the number of those who obtained high stations and large revenues as the price for renouncing Judaism. The following is a list of the more prominent modern converts, the rarity of French names in which is probably because conversion was not necessary to a public career in that country.

A 

 Abd-al-Masih (martyr) (?–died 390 AD) – convert martyred for his faith
 Abraham Abramson (1754–1811) – Prussian coiner and medallist. Born into a Jewish family, he later converted to Christianity.
 Felix Aderca (1891–1962) – Romanian novelist, playwright, poet, journalist and critic, noted as a representative of rebellious modernism in the context of Romanian literature.
 Mortimer J. Adler (1902–2001) – American philosopher, educator, and popular author. He was a convert to Catholicism.
 Michael Solomon Alexander (1799–1845) – first Anglican Bishop of Jerusalem
 Petrus Alphonsi (?–after 1116) – physician in ordinary to King Alfonso VI of Castile
 David Assing (1787–1842), German physician and poet, member of the Assing family
 Lovisa Augusti (1751 or 1756–1790) – opera singer and actress.

B 

 Friedrich Daniel Bach (1756–1830) – German painter
 Juan Alfonso de Baena (?–c. 1435) – medieval Castilian troubadour
 Michael Balint (1896–1970) – Hungarian psychoanalyst who spent most of his adult life in England. He was a proponent of the Object Relations school.
 David Baron (1855–1926) – Jewish convert to Christianity. He began the Hebrew Christian Testimony to Israel missionary organization.
 Jakob (Salomon) Bartholdy, born: Jakob Salomon (1779 –1825) – Prussian diplomatist
 Giovanni Giuda Giona Battista, agent for the king of Poland in the 16th century. Born Jewish and later converted to Roman Catholicism.
 Rachel Beer (1858–1927) – Indian-born British newspaper editor. She was editor-in-chief of The Observer and The Sunday Times. She converted to Christianity.
 Bo Belinsky (1936–2001) – American left-handed pitcher in Major League Baseball.
 Franz Friedrich Benary, aka Franz (Simon) Ferdinand Benary (1805–1860), German philologist
 Karl Albert Benary, aka Karl Albert Agathon Benary, Agathon Benary (1807–1860), German classical scholar
 Eduard Bendemann (1811–1845) – German painter
 Sir Julius Benedict (1804–1885) – English composer
 Theodor Benfey (1809–1881) – German philologist

 Michael Bernays (1834–1897) – professor of literature at Munich
 Boris Berezovsky (1946–2013) – Russian business oligarch, government official, engineer and mathematician; converted to the Eastern Orthodox Church in 1990.
 David Berkowitz (born 1953) – American serial killer
 Max Adolf Bernhard, exactly: (Friedrich Heinrich) Adolf Bernhard Max, Friedrich Heinrich Adolph Bernhard Max (1799–1866) – German professor of music
 Michael Bernays (1834–1897) – German professor of literature
 Gottfried Bernhardy (1800–1875) – German philologist and literary historian
 Marianne Beth (1889–1984) – Jewish Austrian lawyer and feminist. She converted from Judaism to Protestantism.
 , aka Moritz Ballagi,  (1815–1891) – Hungarian professor of ecclesiastical history
 Max Born (1882–1970) – German physicist and mathematician, he won the 1954 Nobel Prize in Physics. Although baptized a Lutheran, he was a deist throughout his life.
 Ludwig Börne (1786–1837) – German political writer and satirist
 John Braham (tenor) (1774–1856) – English tenor opera star
 Moritz Wilhelm August Breidenbach (1796–1856) – German jurist
 Max Büdinger (1828–1902) – German-Austrian historian and professor of history at Vienna

C 

 Abraham Capadose (1795–1874) – Dutch physician and writer; friend of Isaac da Costa
 Victor von Carben (1422–1515) was a German rabbi of Cologne who converted to Catholicism and later became a priest.
 Carl Paul Caspari (1814–1892) – Norwegian theologian
 Paulus (Stephanus) Cassel (1821–1892) – German writer and preacher
 Karl Friedrich Cerf (1782–1845) – German theatrical manager in Berlin
 Jason Chaffetz (born 1967) – former U.S. Representative for Utah's 3rd congressional district from 2009 until his retirement in 2017. He chaired the Committee on Oversight and Government Reform from 2015 until 2017. Chaffetz was raised Jewish, but converted to Mormonism during his time as an undergrad at Brigham Young University.
 Daniel Chwolson (1819–1911) – Russian-Jewish orientalist. He embraced Christianity later.
 Leo de Benedicto Christiano – medieval financier
Hermann Cohen (Carmelite) (1821–1871) – German Jewish pianist to Carmelite friar
 Ludwig Cohn (1834–1871) – German historian
 Julius Friedrich Cohnheim (1839–1884) – German pathologist
 Michael Coren (born 1959) – British-Canadian columnist, author, public speaker, radio host and television talk show host. He converted to Roman Catholicism in his early twenties.
 Gerty Cori (1896–1957) – Czech-American biochemist who became the third woman—and first American woman—to win a Nobel Prize in science, and the first woman to be awarded the Nobel Prize in Physiology or Medicine.
 Isaac da Costa (1798–1860) – Dutch language poet
 Theodor Creizenach (1818–1877) – German professor of literature
 Jehuda Cresques (1360–1410) – Catalan cartographer
 Károly Csemegi (1826–1899) – Hungarian judge who was instrumental in the creation of the first criminal code of Hungary. Born Jewish and later converted to Christianity.
 Pablo Christiani – Spanish Dominican friar who used his position as a New Christian to try to convert other Spanish Jews to Roman Catholicism.

D 

 Ferdinand David (1810–1873) – German virtuoso violinist and composer, raised Jewish and later converted to Christianity
 Marcel Dassault (1892–1986) – French aircraft industrialist; he converted to Roman Catholicism in 1950
 Ludwig Dessoir (1810–1874) – German actor
 Mendel Diness (1827–1900) – Jewish watchmaker in 19th-century Jerusalem Diness later converted to Christianity.

 Benjamin Disraeli (1804–1881) – British Prime Minister and leader of the Conservative Party in the 19th century
 Leopold Ritter von Dittel (1815–1898) – Austrian surgeon
 Alfred Döblin (1878–1957) – German expressionist novelist, essayist, and doctor 
 David Paul Drach (1791–1865) – became librarian of the Propaganda in Rome
 Bob Dylan (born 1941) – popular musician who converted to Christianity in 1979 He later began studying with Chabad, a branch of Hasidic Judaism, though his current religious affiliation is uncertain. See also information on Dylan's conversion to Christianity, born-again period and religious beliefs.
 Joy Davidman (1915–1960) – American poet and writer; her final years of life and marriage to the Christian author C.S. Lewis were partially told in the movie "Shadowlands"

E 
 Alfred Edersheim (1825–1889) – Biblical scholar
 Peter Engel (born c. 1936) – American television producer who is best known for his teenage sitcoms which appeared on TNBC, he was raised Jewish, and has converted to Christianity.
 Christian Ferdinand Ewald (1802–1874) – German divine

F 

 Hans Feibusch (1898–1998) – German painter and sculptor of Jewish heritage, He converted to Christianity and was baptized and confirmed into the Church of England in 1965.
 Charles L. Feinberg (1909–1995) – American biblical scholar and professor of Semitics and Old Testament. In 1930, he converted from Judaism to Christianity through the ministry of Chosen People Ministries.
 Rachel Felix (1820–1858) – French actress
 Pero Ferrús (fl. 1380) – Castilian poet
 Arthur Flegenheimer (1901–1935) – Also known as "Dutch Schultz". American mobster of Jewish heritage, later converted to Catholicism before his death.
 Ilya Fondaminsky (1880–1942) – Jewish Russian author (writing under the pseudonym Bunakov) and political activist, he adopted Christianity and was christened a Russian Orthodox.
 Achille Fould (1800–1867) – French financier and politician
 Wilhelm Fraknoi (1843–1924) – Hungarian bishop; president of Hungarian Academy of Science
 Jacob Frank (1726–1791) – 18th-century Jewish reformer who claimed to be the reincarnation of the self-proclaimed messiah Sabbatai Zevi. He later converted to Christianity in Poland in 1759.
 Wilhelm Frankl (1893–1917) – World War I fighter ace credited with 20 aerial victories, converted to Christianity.
 Giles Fraser (born 1964) – Christian minister and former Canon Chancellor of St Paul's Cathedral
 Emil Albert von Friedberg (1837–1910) – German professor
 Heinrich von Friedberg (1813–1895) – German jurist and statesman
 Rudolf Friedenthal (1827–1890) – German deputy
 Ludwig Friedländer (1824–1909) – German philologist who later converted to Protestantism.
 Julius Friedländer (1813–1884) – German numismatist, Friedländer's entire family embraced Christianity in 1820.
 Max Friedlander (1829–1872) – German-Austrian journalist

G 
 Dennis Gabor (1900–1979) – Hungarian-British electrical engineer and physicist, he later received the 1971 Nobel Prize in Physics. In 1918, his family converted to Lutheranism, but he became an agnostic later in life.
 Eduard Gans (1798–1839) – German philosopher and jurist, exponent of the conservative Right Hegelians
 Hermann Mayer Salomon Goldschmidt (1802–1866) – German astronomer and painter
 Gad Elmaleh - Moroccan-Canadian stand-up comedian and actor, he converted to Catholicism in 2022.

H 

 Fritz Haber (1868–1934) – German chemist and Nobel laureate in Chemistry
 Heinrich Heine (1799–1856) – German writer
 Friedrich Gustav Jakob Henle (1809–1885) – German physician, pathologist and anatomist
 August Wilhelm (Eduard Theodor) Henschel (1790–1856) – professor of botany (1824–1837) at Breslau
 Henriette Herz (1764–1803) – German author
 Ferdinand (von) Hiller (1811–1886) – German musical composer
 Siegfried Hirsch (1816–1860) – professor of history, Halle
 Theodor Hirsch (1806–1881) – professor of history, Greifswald

I 
 Abram Ioffe (1880–1960) – prominent Russian/Soviet physicist. In 1911 he converted to Lutheranism.
 Jorge Isaacs (1837–1895) – Colombian writer, politician and soldier

J 
 Carl Gustav Jacob Jacobi (1804–1857) – professor of mathematics, Berlin
 Heinrich Jacoby (1889–1964) – German educator
  (1826–1890) – professor of medicine, Berlin
 Heinrich Otto Jacoby (1815–1864) – professor of Greek, Königsberg
 Philipp Jaffé (1819–1870) – professor of history, Berlin
 Georg Jellinek (1851–1911) – German legal philosopher
 Paul S. L. Johnson (1873–1950) – American scholar and pastor

K 

 David Kalisch (1820–1872) – German playwright and humorist
 Christian Kalkar, aka  (1803–1886), Swedish writer and divine, father of 
 Felix Philipp Kanitz (1829–1904) – Austro-Hungarian naturalist, geographer, ethnographer, archaeologist and author of travel notes
 Andrew Klavan (born 1954) – filmmaker and novelist
 Julius Leopold Klein (1810–1876) – Hungarian-German litterateur
 Heinrich Kossmann, born: Heumann Coschmann (1813–1836) – German mathematician
 Leopold Kronecker (1823–1891) – German mathematician and logician

L 

 Shia LaBeouf (born 1986) – Hollywood actor who decided to leave Judaism and become a Christian while playing a Christian character in the movie Fury (2014). He had previously contributed to a book entitled I am Jewish in 2004.
 Karl Landsteiner (1868–1943) – Austrian biologist and physician, In 1930 he received the Nobel Prize in Physiology or Medicine. converted from Judaism to Roman Catholicism in 1890
 Hermann Lebert (1813–1878) – German physician
 Karl Lehrs (1802–1878) – German classical scholar
 Mark Lidzbarski (1868–1928) – (born Abraham Mordechai Lidzbarski to a Hasidic Eastern Jewish family in Russian Poland) was a Polish philologist, Semitist and translator of Mandaean texts. Studied Semitic philology in Berlin where he converted to evangelical Christianity and changed his first name to Mark. In 1917, became professor in University of Göttingen and in 1918, a full member of the Göttingen Academy of Sciences. The Lidzbarski Gold Medal for Semitic Philology, which is awarded annually, is named after him.
 Osip Mikhailovich Lerner (1847–1907) – 19th-century Russian intellectual and lawyer
 Daniel Lessmann (1794–1831) – 19th-century historian and poet
 Fanny Lewald (1811–1889) – German author
 Francois Libermann (1802–1852) – French Jewish convert to Catholicism. He found the Congregation of the Immaculate Heart of Mary which merged with the Congregation of the Holy Spirit (Spiritans). He was declared venerable in the Roman Catholic Church (1876) by Pope Pius IX.
 Luis Ramírez de Lucena (c. 1465–c. 1530) – Spanish chess player who published the first still-existing chess book. He is from a family of Jews who converted to Roman Catholicism.
 Jean-Marie Lustiger (1926–2007) – cardinal, former Archbishop of Paris

M 

 Eduard Magnus (1799–1872) – professor of arts, Berlin
 Heinrich Gustav Magnus (1802–1870) – German chemist and physicist
 Ludwig Immanuel Magnus (1790–1861) – German mathematician
 Gustav Mahler (1860–1911) – composer
 Moses Margoliouth (1818–1881) – Jewish historian, uncle of David Samuel Margoliouth
 Karl Marx (1818–1883) – German socialist. His family had converted to Christianity before his birth.
 Lise Meitner (1878–1968) – Austrian physicist who worked on radioactivity and nuclear physics. She converted to Christianity, following Lutheranism, and was baptized in 1908.
 Alexander Men (1935–1990) – Russian priest, Orthodox theologian and author
 Moritz Hermann Eduard Meier (1796–1855) – professor of philosophy, Halle
 Dorothea Mendelssohn (1769–1839) – German social leader, the oldest daughter of the philosopher Moses Mendelssohn.
 Felix Mendelssohn (1809–1847) – composer, a grandson of the philosopher Moses Mendelssohn.
 Hugh Montefiore (1920–2005) – Anglican Bishop of Birmingham from 1977 to 1987
 Robert Moses (1888–1981) – politician and "master builder" of 20th-century New York City
 Andrea De Monte (died before 1597) – former rabbi and missionary to the Jews at Rome
 Samuel Israeli of Morocco (Samuel Marochitanus) – religious writer of 11th century Spain and Morocco

N 

 (Johann) August Wilhelm Neander, born: David Mendel (1789–1850) – Professor of Ecclesiastical History, Berlin
 Joachim Neumann (educator) (1778/79–1865) – German educator and Hebraist
 John von Neumann (1903–1957) – Hungarian-American pure and applied mathematician, physicist, inventor, computer scientist, and polymath. He was baptized a Catholic in 1930.
 Karl Friedrich Neumann (1793–1870) – German orientalist
 Robert Novak (1931–2009) – raised in secular Jewish culture, he converted to Catholicism in May 1998 after his prolific career as a journalist, columnist, and political commentator.

O 
 Harry Frederick Oppenheimer (1908–2000) – South African businessman
 Jacques Offenbach (1819–1880) – French German composer

P 

 Francis Palgrave (1788–1861) – English historian
 Dave Pasch (born 1972) – sports announcer
 Boris Pasternak (1890–1960) – Russian poet, novelist, and literary translator. He was awarded the Nobel Prize for Literature in 1958. He converted to Eastern Orthodoxy from Judaism.
 Paul the Apostle (c. 5–c. 64/65 AD) – early Christian leader and author of many New Testament epistles.
 Corey Pavin (born 1959) – PGA golfer
 Johannes Pfefferkorn (1469–1523) – German theologian and writer
 Friedrich Adolf Philippi (1809–1882) – German Lutheran theologian
 Howard Phillips (1941–2013) – American politician and activist
 Lorenzo Da Ponte (1749–1839) – Italian librettist
 Henry Poper (1813–1870) – German-born Anglican clergyman and missionary

R 

 Marie-Alphonse Ratisbonne (1814–1884) – French Jew who converted to Christianity in 1842 after seeing an apparition of the Virgin Mary.  He later became a priest. He moved to Jerusalem and founded the Convent of Ecce Homo and the Ratisbonne Monastery.
 Harry Reems (1947–2013) – adult film actor
 Paul Reuter (1816–1899) – German entrepreneur, and the founder of Reuters News Agency. On 16 November 1845, he converted to Christianity, in a ceremony at St. George's German Lutheran Chapel in London.
 David Ricardo (1772–1823) – English political economist
 Giovanni Battista Eliano (died 1580) – Italian Jesuit priest and scholar of Oriental languages
 Gillian Rose (1947–1995) – British philosopher and sociologist
 Johann Georg Rosenhain (1816–1887) – German professor of mathematics
 Moishe Rosen (1932–2010) – founder of Jews for Jesus
 Sid Roth (born 1940) – American televangelist
 Joseph Karl Rubino, aka Joseph Carl Friedrich Rubino, Joseph Rubino (1799–1864) – German professor of history, historian of law, Marburg
 Anton G. Rubinstein (1829–1889) – Russian musician

S 

 Joseph d'Aguilar Samuda (1813–1885) – English shipbuilder and Member of Parliament
Adolph Saphir (1831–1891) – Hungarian-born missionary and Presbyterian minister
 Tsaritsa Sarah-Theodora of Bulgaria – wife of tsar Ivan Alexander, tsaritsa in the late Second Bulgarian Empire
 Samuel Isaac Joseph Schereschewsky (1831–1906) – Episcopal Bishop of Shanghai, founder of Saint John's University, Shanghai, Bible translator
 Arnold Schoenberg (1874–1951) – composer who converted to Christianity in 1898 but returned to Judaism in 1933
 Moses Wilhelm Shapira (1830–1884) – Jerusalem antiquities dealer known for allegedly-forged Deuteronomic scroll fragments called the Shapira Scroll found in a cave in Wadi Mujib in Jordan.
 Eduard von Simson (1810–1899) – German jurist and politician
 Otto Spiegelberg (1830–1881) – German professor of medicine, Breslau
 Dan Spitz (born 1963) – lead guitarist of the heavy metal band Anthrax
 Friedrich Julius Stahl (1802–1861) – Prussian jurist and conservative thinker
 Aurel Stein (1862–1943) – Hungarian-British orientalist, archaeologist and  historian
 Edith Stein (1891–1942) – nun, martyr, saint
 Bethel Henry Strousberg (1823–1884) – German financier
Irena Szewińska (1946–2018) – Polish athlete

T 
 Siegbert Tarrasch (1862–1934) – challenger for the World Chess Championship

V 
 Mordechai Vanunu (born 1952) – considered a whistle-blower on Israel's nuclear program who was subsequently kidnapped, tried and imprisoned by Israel.
 Rahel Varnhagen (1771–1833) – German writer and saloniste

W 

 Paul Weidner (1525–1585) – Austrian medical doctor and later professor of Hebrew at the University of Vienna
 Simone Weil (1909–1943) – French philosopher and activist
 Otto Weininger (1880–1903) – Austrian philosopher
 Eugene Wigner (1902–1995) – Hungarian American theoretical physicist and mathematician. He received half of the Nobel Prize in Physics in 1963. Although his family converted to Lutheranism for political reasons, he was an atheist.
 Joseph Wolff (1795–1862) – German missionary

X 
 Morris Ximenes (1762–1837) – 18th-century English merchant

Y 
 David Levy Yulee (1810–1886) – United States Senator from Florida

Z 

 Efrem Zimbalist, Jr. (1918–2014) – American actor
 Israel Zolli (1881–1956) – former Chief Rabbi of Rome

See also 
 Apostasy in Judaism
 Haskalah
 Hebrew Catholics
 Jewish assimilation
 Isaak Markus Jost
 Messianic Judaism
 Who is a Jew?

References

Bibliography 
 Richard Gottheil, Kaufmann Kohler, Isaac Broydé. "Converts to Christianity, Modern" in Jewish Encyclopedia. http://www.jewishencyclopedia.com/view.jsp?artid=759&letter=C

 
C